Polylepis multijuga is a species of plant in the family Rosaceae. It is endemic to montane forests in the Peruvian Northern Andes, between 2700 and 3600 meters above sea level.  It is threatened by habitat loss.

References

multijuga
Endemic flora of Peru
Flora of the Andes
Páramo flora
Vulnerable plants
Trees of Peru
Taxonomy articles created by Polbot